Capotondi is a surname. Notable people with the surname include:
Cristiana Capotondi (born 1980), Italian actress
Giuseppe Capotondi (born 1968), Italian director

Italian-language surnames